Marco Matrone (born 2 July 1987) is a Finnish footballer, who represents Ilves of Veikkausliiga, the Finnish premier division of football.

Career
The midfielder has previously represented FC Honka, FF Jaro, FC Haka and SJK of Veikkausliiga, AC Arezzo of Serie B (mostly junior team), and Sansepolcro on a loan deal.

International career
In March 2008, he was selected to the Finland national under-21 football team.

References
Guardian Football

1987 births
Living people
Finnish footballers
Finnish expatriate footballers
Italian emigrants to Finland
FF Jaro players
FC Haka players
Veikkausliiga players
FC Espoo players
Association football midfielders